Paul Chillan (17 December 1935 – 1 September 2021) was a French footballer who played as a forward in over 200 matches for French Ligue 1 club Nîmes between 1959 and 1967. He was born in La Trinité, Martinique, and made two appearances for the France national team in 1963.

References

1935 births
2021 deaths
Association football forwards
French footballers
Ligue 1 players
Nîmes Olympique players
AC Arlésien players
French people of Martiniquais descent
France international footballers
People from La Trinité, Martinique